Alikadam Cantonment is a cantonment located outside of Bandarban. The 24th Infantry Division (Bangladesh) inhabits the cantonment.

It is one of five cantonments in Chittagong Hill Tracts area.

See also 
 Comilla Cantonment
 Mymensingh Cantonment
 Savar Cantonment

References 

Cantonments of Bangladesh